
Rimas or Remas is a given name, which can be an Arabic feminine name or a Lithuanian masculine name. In Arabic, Rimas is derived from the name of a type of diamond, and was the most popular name for girls born in Jordan in 2009. In Lithuanian, Rimas is a shortened form of Rimantas. It is related to the feminine name Rima and has the diminutive form Rimutis.

People

Given name
Rimas Álvarez Kairelis (born 1974), Argentine rugby player
Rimas Jakelaitis (born 1955), Lithuanian athlete
Rimas Kaukenas (born 1977), Lithuanian basketball player
Rimas Kurtinaitis (born 1960), Lithiuanian basketball player and trainer
Rimas Tuminas (born 1952), Lithuanian theatre director

Surname
Juozas Rimas (born 1942), Lithuanian musician
Robertas Rimas (born 1971), Lithuanian judoka

References

Arabic feminine given names
Lithuanian masculine given names
Lithuanian-language surnames